Kimball & Thompson was the name of an architectural partnership made up of Francis H. Kimball and G. Kramer Thompson from 1892 to 1898.  They were early proponents of steel framed curtain-walled skyscrapers.  They built several buildings in Manhattan, New York City.

Works
 The Empire Building (1895), 71 Broadway
 Manhattan Life Insurance Building (1894; demolished 1964) 64–70 Broadway
 Rhinelander Mansion (1898), Madison Avenue and 72nd Street, design credited to Kimball & Thompson "but a photograph of the mansion published at or near the end of construction included the notation that it was designed by Alexander Mackintosh, an obscure local practitioner."
 Carriage housing for B. Altman's horse-drawn delivery wagons (1896), which survives on West 18th Street, with completely refitted interiors

References

1892 establishments in New York (state)
1898 disestablishments in New York (state)
American companies disestablished in 1898
American companies established in 1892
Companies based in Manhattan
Defunct architecture firms based in New York City
Design companies disestablished in 1898
Design companies established in 1892